Walter Fielding Holloway Blandford (1865–1952) was a British entomologist. He attended Cambridge University, where he took first class in the Natural History Tripos. He served as a Secretary and officer for the Royal Entomological Society of London. His contributions included extensive studies of the beetle family Scolytidae (now classified as a subfamily, Scolytinae), including formal descriptions of many newly-discovered species from around the world.

References

External links 
 

1865 births
1952 deaths
British entomologists
Alumni of the University of Cambridge